Netraganj  is a village development comitte in Sarlahi District in the Janakpur Zone of Centrl Development Region of Nepal. At the time of the 1991 Nepal census it had a population of 6,219 people living in 1,147 individual households.

References

External links
UN map of the municipalities of Sarlahi  District

Populated places in Sarlahi District